Southern Malaysian Hokkien is a local variant of the Min Nan Chinese variety spoken in Central and Southern Peninsular Malaysia (Klang, Melaka, Muar, Tangkak, Segamat, Batu Pahat, Pontian and Johor Bahru). Due to geographical proximity, it is heavily influenced by Singaporean Hokkien.

This dialect is based on Quanzhou-accented varieties of Min Nan, including the Eng Choon (Yongchun) dialect. It is markedly distinct from Penang Hokkien and Medan Hokkien, which are based on the Zhangzhou dialect.

Similar to the situation in Singapore, the term Hokkien is generally used by the Chinese in South-east Asia to refer to Min Nan Chinese (闽南语). Southern Malaysian Hokkien is based on the Quanzhou dialect with some influence from the Amoy dialect.

Phonology
This section is based on Eng Choon (Yongchun) Hokkien spoken in Melaka.

Vowels
There are eight phonemic vowels:

Tones
There are seven tones, five of which are long tones and two are checked tones. Like other varieties of Hokkien, these tones also undergo tone sandhi in non-final positions. The tone values (both base tones and sandhi tones) of the long tones are shown below:

Influences from other languages
Southern Malaysian Hokkien is also subjected to influence from various languages or dialects spoken in Malaysia. This is influenced to a certain degree by the Teochew dialect and is sometimes being regarded to be a combined Hokkien–Teochew speech (especially in Muar, Batu Pahat, Pontian and Johor Bahru).

There are some loanwords from Malay, but they are fewer in number than in Penang Hokkien and do not completely replace the original words in Hokkien. It also has loanwords from English.

Notes

References

See also
 Hoklo people
 Hokkien culture
 Hokkien architecture
 Written Hokkien
 Hokkien media
 Penang Hokkien
 Singaporean Hokkien
 Taiwanese Hokkien
 Medan Hokkien
 Philippine Hokkien
 Amoy dialect
 Speak Hokkien Campaign
 Holopedia
 Chinese in Malaysia
 Chinese in Singapore
 Chinese in Indonesia
Chinese in Philippines

Hokkien-language dialects
Languages of Malaysia